Mandabam is a 2010 Indian Tamil-language action film directed by R. Senthamil Arasu. The film stars S. T. Tamilarasan and Siniya, with Nizhalgal Ravi, Shanmugasundaram, O. A. K. Sundar, Vadivukkarasi, Srinivasan and Gowthami Vembunathan playing supporting roles. The film, produced by S. T. Tamilarasan, had musical score by Iniya Mahesan and was released on 29 October 2010.

Plot

The film begins with an honest police inspector taking the convict Tamilarasan into custody from Palayamkottai Central Prison. The police officer then gives him a mission: to kill the fearsome gangster Sathya under a week's time. Tamilarasan enters a brothel runs by Sabapathy in disguise, and Tamilarasan finds out that Sabapathy works for Sathya. Tamilarasan beats him up and finds out that Sathya is in Chennai. In Chennai, the police inspector takes Tamilarasan to court and the judge asks him about the three people he had kidnapped.

A few years ago, Tamilarasan was an advocate living with his family in a big house. Tamilarasan and his relative Gowri were in love, and their family agreed for the marriage. One day, Tamilarasan had a brutal fight with Sathya's brother Kesavan, and Kesavan became mentally ill after the fight. A vengeful Sathya decided to take Tamilarasan's house, and Sathya's two other brothers killed Tamilarasan's entire family. They took his lover Gowri to the police station, and with a corrupt police inspector, they tried to rape her, but she killed herself to save her honour. When Tamilarasan learned of it, he killed Kesavan in his house and beat everyone in the police station. Tamilarasan then kidnapped the police inspector and Sathya's two brothers. The police then arrested Tamilarasan for kidnapping.

Back to the present, the judge decides to postpone the trial and transfer him to Puzhal Central Prison. Sathya's henchmen kidnap Tamilarasan outside the court, and they then torture him in front of his house. Tamilarasan defeats his henchmen, and he reveals to Sathya that he had buried his brothers in a hall that he had built just in front of his house. Tamilarasan then kills Sathya by burying him alive in the hall, and he decides to become a vigilante who fights against the evils in society.

Cast

S. T. Tamilarasan as Tamilarasan
Siniya as Gowri
Nizhalgal Ravi as Sathya
Shanmugasundaram as Manikkam
O. A. K. Sundar as Police inspector
Vadivukkarasi as Meenakshi
Srinivasan as Sabapathy
Gowthami Vembunathan as Lakshmi
Soni
Ansiba Hassan
A. S. Kannan
Bhaskar
D. Yuvaraj
Sathyanarayanan
Krishnaveni Nagaraj
Sadhan as Police inspector
Jayakumar
M. Azhagappan
Kesavan as Kesavan
Dayalan
Ragasya in a special appearance

Production
After directing the film Manase Mounama (2007), R. Senthamil Arasu returned with Mandabam under the banner of Thilaka Arts. A lawyer by profession, S. T. Tamilarasan who had acted as hero in films like Manase Mounama (2007), Chella Thiruda (2007) and Megam (2008) had produced the film and he played his real-life role on screen. Siniya who was credited as Thejamai in Madurai Ponnu Chennai Paiyan (2008) signed to play the heroine. Iniya Mahesan, a former assistant to Sabesh–Murali, had scored the music. "The film's message is to spread the need for public awareness amongst the people", revealed Tamilarasan about the film which deals with issues like sand thefts, financial loan recovery goons and property sharks. Srinivasan, a medical practitioner, was cast to play the villain role.

Soundtrack

The soundtrack was composed by Iniya Mahesan. The soundtrack, released in 2010, features six tracks with lyrics written by Priyan and Ravipriyan.

References

2010 films
2010s Tamil-language films
Indian action films
Indian vigilante films
2010 action films
2010s vigilante films